Ekin Türkmen (born 22 August 1984) is a Turkish actress. She is best known for starring in TV series, including Bitter Life, Menekşe ile Halil and Adanalı.

Filmography

Film

Television

Streaming platforms

Theatre

References

External links 

1984 births
Living people
Actresses from İzmir
Turkish film actresses
Turkish television actresses